Pultenaea reflexifolia, commonly known as wombat bush-pea, is a species of flowering plant in the family Fabaceae and is endemic to isolated parts of Victoria. It is an erect shrub with its foliage covered with tangled hairs, and has elliptic to narrow egg-shaped leaves with the narrower end towards the base, and yellow and red pea-like flowers arranged singly or in pairs on the ends of short side branches.

Description

Taxonomy and naming
Pultenaea muelleri was first formally described in 1864 by George Bentham in Flora Australiensis from specimens collected by Ferdinand von Mueller and by "W.S. Whan" near Skipton in about 1860. James Hamlyn Willis considered that specimens found in the mountains of Gippsland were "strikingly dissimilar", being a "small wiry shrub"  rather than a "tall shrub with spreading foliage" of the typical form. He considered these dissimilar plants to be a variety he named Pultenaea muelleri var. reflexifolia, published his description in The Victorian Naturalist and since it was found in the Skipton-Wombat Forest, proposed the common name wombat bush-pea. In 2003, Rogier Petrus Johannes de Kok raised the variety to species status as Pultenaea reflexifolia in Australian Systematic Botany.

Distribution and habitat
Wombat bush-pea is restricted to scattered areas of dry forest west of Melbourne.

References

reflexifolia
Flora of Victoria (Australia)
Plants described in 1940
Taxa named by James Hamlyn Willis